The human ARG1 gene encodes the protein arginase.

Function 

Arginase catalyzes the hydrolysis of arginine to ornithine and urea. At least two isoforms of mammalian arginase exist (types I and II) which differ in their tissue distribution, subcellular localization, immunologic crossreactivity and physiologic function. The type I isoform encoded by this gene, is a cytosolic enzyme and expressed predominantly in the liver as a component of the urea cycle. Inherited deficiency of this enzyme results in argininemia, an autosomal recessive disorder characterized by hyperammonemia. Two transcript variants encoding different isoforms have been found for this gene.

References

External links

Further reading